International School of Boston (ISB;  or LIB, previously École Internationale de Boston) is a bilingual co-educational TPS-12 private school in Cambridge, Massachusetts.

With 560 students from over 43 different countries, ISB is one of the few schools in New England offering the International Baccalaureate.  ISB also offers the French Baccalaureate, and all graduating seniors receive the American high school diploma in addition to one of these international diplomas.

History

The International School of Boston was founded in 1962 as the Jardin d’Enfants (literally Children's Garden, French for “Kindergarten”) in hopes of integrating French language and culture into children's educational experiences. The Jardin d’Enfants was one of the first bilingual programs in the United States.

Since 1962 ISB has grown from 15 children to 560, and expanded to serve TPS through 12th grade. Students range in ages from 2 to 18 and come from 43 nations.

The school had a nomadic existence in its early years as it searched for suitable space. From the basement of the Lutheran Church in Belmont, to a church in Newton Corner, to the Armenian Church in Cambridge, to the Parmenter School on Irving Street in Arlington (where the Pre-school and Kindergarten campus has been since 1983), it finally settled in 1997 in its current location in Cambridge.  Its main building is the former Cambridge Almshouse, built in 1850 and listed on the National Register of Historic Places.

It also underwent several name changes, including Ecole Bilingue de Boston (French name), and French-American International School of Boston (English name). Since January 2006, the English name has been the International School of Boston.

Bilingual education

With one of the first bilingual programs in the US, ISB has almost 60 years of experience in bilingual education.

ISB's curriculum is bilingual from TPS through 12th grade, with Preschool and Kindergarten being full-immersion programs in French.

The International Baccalaureate

In addition to the American High School Diploma, ISB offers both the French Baccalaureate and International Baccalaureate (IB).

Arts

ISB has an extremely strong theater arts program, culminating in a week-long performing arts festival each May.  For several years, ISB has participated at the Theater Festival at the Lycée Français de New York, winning first prize in 2006 and the “Special Prize of the Jury” in 2007.  Visual arts also have a week-long festival in May during which student artwork is exhibited.  The school choirs have several performances throughout the year.

Athletics

ISB offers competitive teams in fencing, soccer, basketball and volleyball. In the spring of 2007, ISB hosted the French-American School of Rhode Island and the École Française du Maine in a soccer tournament. ISB has had a competitive Fencing Club for many years, as well as additional clubs for mixed sports, handball, volleyball, and badminton. In January 2013 the ISB varsity men's épée team finished second at the Massachusetts State Championships with all three of their fencers finishing in the top five individually.

Community service

All ISB Middle and Upper School students are required to take part in service activities and encouraged to invest their time in creative, active and service-based projects. 

Students participate in the Cambridge soup kitchen and the Walk for Hunger, volunteer within the school and help in the library, serve as homework aides for elementary students, support Open Houses, and aid the Parents’ Association with fundraising activities and events.

After-School Clubs

Clubs include: Math, science, circus arts, knitting, cross-stitch, chess, art, theater, singing, cooking, jazz dance, mime, Spanish, ballet, yoga, video animation, sculpture, jewelry-beading, gardening, calligraphy, and astronomy.

Summer Programs

The school offers a summer camp program run by ISB teachers for ISB and non-ISB elementary school students.

Accreditations

The International School of Boston (ISB) is accredited by The New England Association of Schools and Colleges (NEASC), Council of International Schools (CIS), French Ministry of Education (MEN),  and International Baccalaureate Organisation (IBO).  It is also a member of the National Association of Independent Schools (NAIS), Association of Independent Schools in New England (AISNE), Association of French Schools of North America (AFSA) and Mission laïque française (MLF).

See also

American schools in France:
 American School of Paris - An American international school in France
 American School of Grenoble

References

External links
 International School of Boston
 French-American International School of Boston (Archive)

Bilingual schools
Schools in Middlesex County, Massachusetts
Education in Cambridge, Massachusetts
International Baccalaureate schools in Massachusetts
International schools in the United States
Private elementary schools in Massachusetts
Private middle schools in Massachusetts
Private high schools in Massachusetts
Educational institutions established in 1962
1962 establishments in Massachusetts